The Sundance Range is a mountain range in the Canadian Rockies, south of the town of Banff. It is located on the Continental Divide, which forms the boundary between British Columbia and Alberta in this region.

Mountains
This range includes the following mountains and peaks:

References

Further reading 
 Jane G. Ferrigno, U.S. Geological Survey Professional Paper, P 216

Dave Birrell, 50 Roadside Panoramas in the Canadian Rockies, P 81

Ranges of the Canadian Rockies
Mountain ranges of Alberta
Mountain ranges of British Columbia